Revolver is the title of a short-lived British comic book magazine published by Fleetway Publications in the early 1990s. Founded by Steve MacManus and edited by Peter Hogan, Revolver was a spin-off from 2000AD. Revolver attempted to take advantage of the 1960s revival which was sweeping British culture in the early 1990s, including the explosion of the British music scene at the time.

The title of the magazine referred to its revolving, diverse content; it also alluded to the Beatles' album of the same name.

Revolver gained a small following, but not enough for it to last beyond its seventh issue. It was given the 1991 UK Comic Art Award for Best New Publication.

Publication history
Revolver was published between July 1990 and January 1991, lasting for seven regular issues and two specials. After it was canceled, some sources blamed the magazine's poor sales on it being labeled "Mature Content", and thus being sold on newsstands next to men's magazines. Two of its stories were concluded in another Fleetway publication, Crisis (Crisis itself folded a few months later).

The magazine's letters page was called "The Whole Wide Whirl".

Contents 
Revolver featured a wide range of graphic styles and contributors, everything from a surreal inside-the-mind-of Jimi Hendrix storyline (Purple Days), a psychedelic superhero in the form of Peter Milligan and Brendan McCarthy's Rogan Gosh, distorted caricatures in Pinhead Nation (Shaky Kane), plus Happenstance and Kismet (Paul Neary and Steve Parkhouse), student-house antics in Dire Streets (Julie Hollings), as well as the resurrection of Dan Dare, this time in a story called simply Dare. In Dare, writer Grant Morrison and artist Rian Hughes gave a new interpretation to the original Eagle character in a political story, setting Dan Dare against a thinly veiled caricature of the Thatcher government.

Two Revolver Specials were also published, a Revolver Horror Special (including some material by Neil Gaiman and Mark Buckingham) around Halloween 1990, and a Revolver Romance Special in March 1991, two months after the cancellation of Revolver itself.

After Revolver's cancellation, Dare and Happenstance and Kismet were completed in the pages of Crisis. Dare was collected into a four-issue limited series in 1992 by Fantagraphics. Rogan Gosh was compiled into a collected edition in 1994 by the Vertigo imprint of DC Comics.

List of stories

See also
 Warrior
 Crisis
Deadline
 Blast!

References

Notes

Sources consulted 
 Rigby, Regie. "Fool Britannia: 'These I Have Loved  - Part Three: Six Shooting!'," Comics Bulletin (2011). Archived at the Wayback Machine

External links
 Brendan McCarthy interview
 Revolver contents listing at Barney database

1990 comics debuts
Comics magazines published in the United Kingdom
Magazines established in 1990
Magazines disestablished in 1991
Fleetway and IPC Comics titles
Monthly magazines published in the United Kingdom
Defunct British comics